Sanhe is a county-level city administered by the Langfang prefecture-level city in eastern Hebei province, People's Republic of China. Sanhe city, Dachang Hui Autonomous County, and Xianghe County form the "Northern Three Counties of Langfang", an exclave of Hebei province surrounded by the Beijing and Tianjin municipalities.

The name of the city literally means "Three Rivers".

Administrative divisions
Sanhe has 5 subdistricts and 10 towns. There are 395 villages within those subdistricts/towns.

Subdistricts
 Dingshengdongdajie Subdistrict, Juyangxidajie Subdistrict, Kejilu Subdistrict, Yingbinbeilu Subdistrict, Xinggongdongdajie Subdistrict

Towns
 Juyang, Liqizhuang, Yangzhuang, Huangzhuang, Xinji, Duanjialing, Huangtuzhuang, Gaolou, Qixinzhuang, Yanjiao

Development Zones
 Yanjiao Economic and Technological Development Zone (national level)
 Sanhe Agricultural High-tech Zone

Climate

Transportation

Expressway & Highway
 G0121 Beijing–Qinhuangdao Expressway, G95 Capital Area Loop Expressway
 China National Highway 102
 Provincial Highway: S204, S206, S274

Railway
 Beijing-Qinhuangdao railway
 Beijing-Tangshan intercity railway (Under construction)
 Beijing-Binhai intercity railway (Under construction)

Subway
Pinggu line (Line 22) of Beijing Subway have 5 stations in Sanhe. The line is under planning.

History
Sanhe was virtually destroyed by a major earthquake that occurred on September 2, 1679.

Attack on ARD film crew
In February, 2013 German television crew from ARD was attacked by a group of men in at least 4 vehicles. The ARD crew including correspondent Christine Adelhardt had been filming in the village of Da Yan Ge Zhuang in Juyang, Sanhe city. A group of men in two vehicles drove to the ARD crew and intimidated them. Two other vehicles joined the group of men and pursued the fleeing ARD van on the highway. The ARD van was forced to a halt and 5 to 6 of the men got out to smash the windshield of the van with baseball bats. The ARD van was able to get away and sought help on passing two motorcycle policemen, who tried stopping the men from once again attacking the ARD crew. However, only after police reinforcements arrived was the situation brought under control.

According to statement from the Foreign Correspondents Club of China condemning the attack, a witness identified one of the vehicles involved in the attack as belonging to the "Da Yan Ge Zhuang village communist party secretary". The ARD crew was taken into police custody and questioned for 16 hours then released. A police officer told an ARD reporter that the attackers had been "offended" because the crew did not ask for permission to film in the village.

References

External links
 Sanhe City Government Website

County-level cities in Hebei
Enclaves in China
 
Langfang